Dominik Lomovšek (born September 13, 1954), is a former Yugoslav ice hockey goaltender. He played for the Yugoslavia men's national ice hockey team at the 1984 Winter Olympics in Sarajevo.

References

External links

1954 births
Living people
KHL Medveščak Zagreb players
HDD Olimpija Ljubljana players
HK Partizan players
Ice hockey players at the 1984 Winter Olympics
Olympic ice hockey players of Yugoslavia
Slovenian ice hockey goaltenders
Sportspeople from Ljubljana
Yugoslav ice hockey goaltenders